Scary sharp is a method of sharpening woodworking tools with sandpaper instead of conventional methods of oilstone or waterstone sharpening. The sandpaper referred to here can be any abrasive impregnated sheet used in the various industries to smooth surfaces and examples include glass paper, silicon carbide, emery cloth, etc. The sandpaper is affixed to another hard, flat substrate to create the sharpening surface. Sheet-glass is commonly used, but a machinist's granite surfacing block, marble baking slabs, plywood, medium-density fibreboard (MDF) or even jointer out-feed tables will produce satisfactory results. The method of fixation is usually a matter of the user's preference, and can include plain water (by means of surface tension), sprayed-on adhesive, or by simply using adhesive-backed abrasive paper.  This is exactly the same method as that used by materials scientists in preparing polished samples for metallography.

The basics of the method involves holding the cutting area of the chisel or plane iron flat to the sandpaper and gently moving back and forth in either side to side or back to front motions, as one would with a sharpening stone.  The blade is taken through a series of increasingly finer grades of sandpaper.

Advantages
The most notable advantage of the scary sharp system is speed and cost. Anyone with access to sandpaper and a reasonably flat surface can sharpen any cutting tool, often with good results. Unlike traditional stones, no maintenance is required for the scary-sharp set-up, since the sharpening surface does not form a hollow with repeated, uneven usage. A hollowed surface is undesirable in most sharpening situations, an example being the flat surface required in the back (as opposed to the beveled surface) of most woodworking plane irons. Compared to stones, sandpaper is lower in cost as well. A fresh sheet of sandpaper often cuts significantly faster than a bench sharpening stone. For this reason, coarse-grit papers can be used to dress a damaged cutting edge quickly, removing chips along the edge and preparing it for the next stage/grit of edge refinement.

Disadvantages

The blade is assumed to be well shaped, with a clean accurate bevel. The back of the chisel is also flattened and cleaned up using the same grades of sandpaper to ensure a clean sharp edge where the back and bevel meet.  Nicks, deep scratches, or excessive wear may call for shaping the profile on a grinder before beginning this method.

See also
 Sharpening jig

References

External links
 Scary Sharp Kits and Supplies 
 Early Usenet rec.woodworking posting on Scary Sharp (1995)
 Sandpaper sharpening demonstration video
 DIY 80,000 Grit Polishing Stropping Plates Under $70 – YouTube video demonstrating how to make stropping plates from 3M lapping film sheets and an aluminium plates
 WHAT IS THE SCARY SHARP SYSTEM?

Sharpening
Woodworking